Numerous proposals have been made for improvements to the Melbourne tram network, the largest such network in the world. Nearly all of these have been for track extensions of existing lines to connect with nearby railway station or to service new areas and suburbs.

Extensions currently in planning

Caulfield to Chadstone, Monash and Rowville route 

In April 2018, the State Government of Victoria announced a new extension of the tram network from Caulfield. The 18 km (11.1 mi) extension would run from Caulfield station to Chadstone, Monash University, Waverley Park and Rowville. The state government allocated $3 million to plan the route, which would be constructed in two stages, with the first running from Caulfield to Monash. This proposal is a light rail alternative to the long-proposed Rowville railway line project. In the 2018-2019 Federal Budget, the Australian Government committed $475 million to a heavy rail line from Caulfield to Monash University that would run on the same corridor as the light rail proposal. 

In 2019, nearby local councils expressed concern that the project had been shelved. In 2021, Monash University began lobbying the state and federal governments for an alternative rapid bus plan, using experimental "trackless tram" technology. In November 2021 the Minister for Transport Infrastructure told state parliament that the government was examining a rapid bus alternative and was working with the federal government to develop a business case.

Trams routes to Fishermans Bend 

State and local governments have also proposed the extension of Route 48 from its current terminus at Victoria Harbour in Docklands across the Yarra River and into the Fishermans Bend precinct, a future major urban renewal area. It would require the construction of a new tram-only bridge and generally follow the path of Fennell and Plummer Streets. The tram extension is proposed as an interim solution to connect Fishermans Bend residents to the CBD via mass transit until the metropolitan railway network can be extended with new underground stations. The proposed bridge has faced some opposition from local groups and residents, whom fear it will destroy a local park and prevent tall boats from mooring at a nearby marina and travelling upstream. The bridge has been costed by the State Government at over $200 million.

The State Government released a Framework for Fishermans Bend in October 2018 that proposed two new tram routes through the area: one running through the new suburbs of Sandridge and Wirraway along Plummer Street, and the other running through Lorimer and the Employment Precinct along Turner Street. The Framework gives a 'medium term' delivery timeframe of 2020–2025, while Infrastructure Australia also identified the project as a 'medium term' priority. The 2019-2020 state budget allocated $4.5 million to plan the tram routes to Fishermans Bend and develop a preliminary business case for the project. As of 2022, no further state government announcements have been made about the proposals.

Proposals

Route 3 to Chadstone 

In 2005, the Public Transport Users Association (PTUA) proposed for an extension of Route 3 from East Malvern. It would run from its current terminus to East Malvern railway station, before continuing until it reaches Chadstone Shopping Centre. It would provide Chadstone with some form of rail link, also connecting it directly to a railway station.

Route 5 to Darling station 

The extension from Malvern of route 5 has been proposed by the PTUA and the Rail Futures Institute. It would run from its current terminus to Darling railway station and Darling Village.

Route 6 to Ashburton 

In response to the State Government's 2001 Melbourne 2030 planning policy, the PTUA lobbied to extend tram route 6 from its current terminus at Glen Iris railway station to Ashburton railway station. It would require an extra 2.2 km of track extending over the Monash Freeway, continuing along High Street until reaching the level crossing.

Route 11 to Reservoir 

The City of Darebin has argued for the extension of Route 11 to the Reservoir activity centre. The most likely route would be to continue north along Gilbert Road reaching Edwardes Lake, before turning right into Edwardes Street and continuing east to a new terminus near Reservoir railway station in the commercial area. The extension would cover a distance of just over 3 km.

An alternative, which appeared in Darebin's 2010 proposal, has the tram heading north on Gilbert Rd, east on Henty St, north on Spratling St, then east on Edwardes St to the terminus. This route avoids the steep grade around Edwardes Lake.

The cost was estimated to be $30 million, with $50,000 required for a feasibility study. In February 2018 the federal Opposition Leader Bill Shorten pledged $40 million to extend Route 11 to the end of Gilbert Road if the Labor party won government. This announcement was criticised by some for failing short of funding the full route to Reservoir station. The State Government has made no commitment to investigate or build the extension.

Route 16 to Kew Junction 
The PTUA proposed extending the route of Route 16 with the tram continuing left at the corner of Cotham and Glenferrie Roads, following the current Route 109 for 800m to the west before terminating at the Kew Junction. This would allow interchange with Route 48 trams and the 200 and 207 buses via Johnston Street. Little infrastructure would be required, as the tracks are already in place.

Route 19 to Gowrie Station 

In the lead up to the 2014 State election, the Greens proposed extending route 19 from its current terminus at Bakers Road, North Coburg for a length of 3.7 km passing Merlynston Station, Fawkner Station and ending with a new terminus outside Gowrie Station. In 2018, the Rail Futures Institute called for a similar extension to Merlynston Station.

Route 48 to Doncaster 

The PTUA, City of Boroondara, City of Manningham and City of Yarra have advocated for an extension of Route 48 to Doncaster as a cheaper and more efficient alternative to the proposed Doncaster railway line. The 4-kilometre extension would be a continuation of the route along Doncaster Road past Greythorn Village, Doncaster Park and Ride with a terminus at Westfield Doncaster or possibly the mc2 community facility in Doncaster Hill.

The extension was first proposed in the mid-1940s, soon after the tram route was extended to its present-day terminus at Balwyn Road. The then-City of Camberwell made the proposal formally to the Tramways Board in 1945, but the project was not pursued.

In 2006, the Liberal opposition under Ted Baillieu promised the extension by 1 July 2010 if he was to win office in the next election, pricing it at $35 million. It was stated that there would have been about two accessible stops every kilometre, similar to the recent Box Hill tram extension. The Labor Government held onto power, and the extension was not built, even when the Liberals later won office in 2010.

A study commissioned by Manningham Council argued that the steep gradient on Doncaster Road would preclude current rolling stock from operating safely on Doncaster Road. The report also suggested that extra trams would need to be purchased to address the issue. The report was never released, but the PTUA and other groups criticised its public findings, contending that steeper gradients are present across the existing network, such as Burke Road in Camberwell and along the Burwood Highway. The Labor state government in 2016 said it would not fund the extension.  

During the 2022 election campaign the Liberal opposition under Matthew Guy committed to the extension, estimating the cost to be $102 million.

Route 57 to East Keilor 

In the lead up to the 2014 State election, the Greens proposed extending Route 57 for 5.5 km from its current terminus in Maribyrnong along Canning Street and Milleara Road before reaching a new terminus at the Keilor East shopping precinct. In 2018, the Rail Futures Institute called for a similar extension of the route to Lower Avondale Heights.

Route 58 to Hartwell 

The PTUA has proposed a continuation of Route 58 from its current terminus east down Toorak Road, terminating near to where it would join the current Route 75 and the Alamein train line at Hartwell station. It would cover just over 4 km.

Route 59 to Melbourne Airport 
In 2018, the Rail Futures Institute proposed an extension of Route 59 to Melbourne Airport in Tullamarine alongside a rapid airport rail link, primarily as a commuting service for airport workers.

Route 67 to Carnegie station 

The PTUA and the Rail Futures Institute have both proposed a continuation of Route 67 from its current terminus north up Koornang Road, terminating at Carnegie railway station and passing through Carnegie shopping strip. It would cover just 900 metres and become a modal interchange.

Route 75 to Knox 

In the lead up to the 2014 State election the Greens proposed extending route 75 from its current terminus outside Vermont South Shopping Centre for a length of 6.8 km down Burwood Highway passing Westfield Knox City Shopping Centre and ending near a Knox City Council precinct. The Eastern Transport Coalition, an advocacy group representing seven local councils in Melbourne's East, has called for this extension.

During the 2022 state election the Liberal opposition party promised $134 million to extend route 75 5.1km to Westfield Knox, although the party said the line could be delivered as a rapid bus line instead of a tram. The party promised a study to investigate higher-capacity public transport to Upper Ferntree Gully, and along Mountain Highway to Bayswater.

Route 75 to Footscray 

Melbourne and Maribyrnong City Councils have advocated for a new tram link between the CBD and Footscray. The commonly cited route would be to extend Route 75 tram tracks from their current terminus near Harbour Town in Docklands along the median of Footscray Road, acting as a light rail with minimal stops, before crossing the Maribyrnong River into Napier Street. From here it is possible the tram could terminate at Footscray railway station by turning right at Hyde Street, or following Whitehall and Hopkins Streets to rejoin Route 82 as one long route.

Route 86 to South Morang 

The City of Whittlesea's 2016 Future Transport Plan called for an extension to the Route 86 tram as a 'very high' priority. The council proposed an extension of the route from its current terminus at University Hill near Bundoora's RMIT Campus to the Plenty Valley Town Centre in South Morang. This proposal included a stop at South Morang station. Other local plans have included going to Hawkstowe station and even as far as Doreen via Mernda.

New North Melbourne to Richmond route 

Leading up to the 2013 Australian federal election, the Australian Greens proposed the creation of a new east–west route between North Richmond and North Melbourne railway stations. It would travel along Victoria Street/Parade for most of its route, before diverting south in the west to terminate in front of North Melbourne station. Most of the route is currently used for other lines, such as Route 109 between St Vincents Plaza and North Richmond Station and Route 57 between Errol Street and Elizabeth Street. Tram tracks currently exist on some sections of Victoria St, but are unused and in disrepair. The Rail Futures Institute proposed similar routes along Victoria Street/Parade in 2018.

New Port Melbourne to St Kilda route 

A 5 km tram link between St Kilda and Port Melbourne along Beaconsfield Parade was first proposed in 2004, subsequently promoted by the City of Port Phillip in 2005 and backed by Tourism Victoria. A 2007 feasibility study into the route found that the high density population could sustain around 200,000 annual commuter trips and that a "shuttle tram" between the two bayside suburbs would be financially viable if patrons were charged $6 per one-way trip.

See also
 Trams in Melbourne
 Proposed Melbourne rail extensions

References

Public transport in Melbourne
Trams in Melbourne
Proposed public transport in Australia